"Back In Stride" is a 1985 single by Philadelphia based R&B group Maze.  As with all of Maze's releases, the vocals were performed by Frankie Beverly, who also wrote and produced the single.  The mid-tempo single claimed the number one spot on the soul singles chart, remaining there for two weeks, and reached eighty-eight on the Hot 100, in the spring of 1985.

References

1985 singles
Maze (band) songs
1985 songs
Songs written by Frankie Beverly